The 2019-20 KBL season was the 24th season of the Korean Basketball League (KBL), the highest level of basketball in South Korea. Ulsan Hyundai Mobis Phoebus was the defending champion.

On 24 March 2020, the KBL decided to cancel the remainder of the season because of the COVID-19 pandemic. Initially some games in February were played behind closed doors but, as with other domestic sports leagues, government restrictions forced the KBL to forfeit the rest of the season. Hence there was no Play-offs MVP awarded this season.

The KBL, as it announced the cancellation of the remainder of the regular season and the playoffs, said no champions would be crowned this season. The Seoul SK Knights and the Wonju DB Promy went into the record books as the co-first-placed teams in the regular season.

Clubs

Regular season 

 Source:

Individual awards

Yearly awards
Most Valuable Player: Heo Hoon (Busan KT Sonicboom)
Foreign Player of the Year: Jameel Warney (Seoul SK Knights)
Coach of the Year: Lee Sang-beom (Wonju DB Promy)
Rookie of the Year: Kim Hoon (Wonju DB Promy)
KBL Best 5
Heo Hoon (Busan KT Sonicboom)
Kim Jong-kyu (Wonju DB Promy)
Song Kyo-chang (Jeonju KCC Egis)
Jameel Warney (Seoul SK Knights)
Cady Lalanne (Changwon LG Sakers)
Sixth Man Award: Choi Sung-won (Seoul SK Knights)
Skill Development Award: Kim Nak-hyeon (Incheon Electroland Elephants)
Defensive Best 5
Moon Seong-gon (Anyang KGC)
Chinanu Onuaku (Wonju DB Promy)
Choi Sung-won (Seoul SK Knights)
Lee Seoung-hyun (Goyang Orion Orions)
Jang Jae-seok (Goyang Orion Orions)
Defensive Player of the Year: Moon Seong-gon (Anyang KGC)
Fair Play Award: Ham Ji-hoon (Ulsan Hyundai Mobis Phoebus)

Individual statistic leaders

Round MVP
The season was cancelled in the middle of the fifth round. As a result, there was no round MVP awarded for the fifth and sixth rounds. The following players were named MVP of the Round:
Round 1: Heo Hoon (Busan KT Sonicboom)
Round 2: Choi Jun-yong (Seoul SK Knights)
Round 3: Song Kyo-chang (Jeonju KCC Egis)
Round 4: Doo Kyung-min (Wonju DB Promy)

Records
 On 9 November 2019, Lee Dae-sung set a new record for double-doubles (points and assists, 30 or more points) among domestic players. He scored 30 points and recorded 15 assists. Johnny McDowell holds the overall record, with 36 points and 15 assists.
 On 9 February 2020, Heo Hoon put up 24 points and 21 assists and became the first player in KBL history to achieve the "20–20" in points scored and assists. Previously, the "20–20" record had only been achieved in the categories of scoring and rebounding. Heo's 21 assists is the second highest record for assists achieved in a single game. Kim Seung-hyun holds the all-time record, with 23 assists, but it was achieved in overtime while Heo's record was achieved in regular time.

References

External links
  

Korean Basketball League seasons
KBL season